You're in Love may refer to:

"You're in Love" (Ratt song)
"You're in Love" (Wilson Phillips song)

See also
When You're in Love (disambiguation)
You're in Love, Charlie Brown, an animated television special
"You're in Love with a Psycho", 2017 song by band Kasabian